Schistura polytaenia is a species of ray-finned fish, a stone loach, in the genus Schistura. It has only been recorded at its type locality a stream in Tengchong County in Yunnan which is part of the Irrawaddy River system.

References

P
Fish described in 1982